Forte de São João or Fortaleza de São João (also de São João Baptista) may refer to several forts:

In Portugal

Mainland
 Fort of São João do Arade, in the Algarve, Portugal
 Fort São João, outlying the Campo Maior Castle in Portalegre District, Portugal: see Battle of Albuera

Azores
 Forte de São João (São Mateus da Calheta), on Terceira Island, Azores
 Castelo de São João Baptista do Monte Brasil, also known as Fortaleza de São João Baptista, on Terceira Island, Azores
 Forte de São João Baptista da Praia Formosa on Santa Maria Island, Azores
 Forte de São João Evangelista, in Vila do Porto, Santa Maria Island, Azores

Other islands
 Forte de São João Baptista das Berlengas, in the Berlengas archipelago

In Brazil
 Fortaleza de São João (Rio de Janeiro), in Rio de Janeiro, Brazil
 Forte de São João Batista do Brum, in Recife, Brazil
 Forte de São João da Bertioga, on Santo Amaro Island, São Paulo, Brazil

Elsewhere
 Fortaleza de São João Baptista de Ajudá, in Benin
 Forte de São João Baptista de Ternate, in Maluku Islands, Indonesia
 Forte de São João de Mamora, in La Mamora, Morocco